Chiwetalu Agu  (born 1956) is a Nigerian actor. He won the 2012 Nollywood award for 'best actor in indigenous movie (non-English speaking language)'. His usage of specific language slangs, phrases or clichés in many films has made him uniquely a household name in Nigeria and among Nollywood fans in general. While asserting that comic genres is a unique vehicle in projecting Nigerian culture globally as well as establishing the Nollywood brand, Agu is listed as one of the outstanding comedians who have contributed to the development of Nollywood comic genres by Prof. Femi Shaka of the University of Port Harcourt. Agu is married to Nkechi and has three sons and two daughters.

Early years 
Agu's versatility dates back to the transition of Nigerian television soap operas to Nollywood movies. Before the inception of Nollywood, about 31 years ago, television soap opera was the order of the day and Agu featured in Nigerian Television Authority Channel 8 Enugu's Ikoro, produced by Joe Onyekwelu. He also featured in ETV Channel 50, now ESBS. in soaps like Baby Come Now and Ripples (in Lagos), produced by Chico Ejiro's brother, Zeb; in the latter he played the character of Chief Abunna.

Filmography 
There is a record of at least about 150 movies in which Agu has been cast.

{| class="wikitable"
|-
! Year !!      Film      !! Role   !! Note
|-
|         || Last Ofalla 1-4|| ||
|-
|         || Taboo|| Ichie Ogwu ||
|-
|2002
|Old School
|
|
|-
| 1986 || Things Fall Apart|| ||
|-
|         || Ripples|| ||
|-
| 2008 || Return of Justice By Fire|| ||
|-
|         || Traditional Marriage 1 & 2|| ||
|-
|        || Fire on the Mountain 1 & 2|| ||
|-
|         || Price of the Wicked|| ||
|-
|         || Dr. Thomas|| || with Sam Loco Efe
|-
|         || The Priest Must Die|| ||
|-
|          || The Price of Sacrifice|| ||
|-
|          || The Catechist|| ||
|-
|           || Police Recruit|| ||
|-
|           || Sunrise 1 & 2|| ||
|-
|           || Old School 1-3|| ||
|-
|           || Honorable 1 & 2|| ||
|-
|           || Sounds of Love 1 & 2|| ||
|-
|                || Nkwocha|| ||
|-
|               || Across the Niger|| ||
|-
|               || The Plain Truth 1 7 2|| ||
|-
|
|Sounds of Love 1 & 2
|
|
|-
|
|Church Man 1 & 2
|Ukpabi
|
|-
|
|Holy Anger 1 & 2
|
|
|-
|
|Evil Twin
|
|with Pete Edochie
|-
|
|Beauty and the Beast 1-3
|
|
|-
|
|Royal Messengers 1 & 2
|
|
|-
|
|Royal Destiny 1 & 2
|
|
|-
|2007
|Burning kingdom 1 & 2
|
|
|-
|
|The Maidens
|
|with Clarion Chukwurah
|-
|
|Battle of the Gods 1 & 2
|
|
|-
|2018
|The Ghost and the Tout
|
|
|-
|2017
|The Wedding Party 2
|
|with Adesua Etomi
|-
|2019
|Ordinary Fellows
|Mr. Mgbu
|a film by Lorenzo Menakaya
|-
|2019
|She Is
|chief Amosun
|-
|2022
|De jumbled
|Alaka
|directed by Benneth Nwankwo
|-
|2022
|Aghugho Anyaukwu |Ubachi
|directed by Uzoma Sunday Logicman
|}

 Videography 

 Controversies 
Agu has raised controversies with comments where he has said that he will act for a good price and described the sexual harassment alleged in Nollywood as an issue with a general phenomenon. He added "Nollywood actresses are well endowed". See also interview in The Daily Independent.

On 7 October 2021, Chiwetalu Agu was arrested by soldiers at Iweka Bridge in Onitsha, and spent a night in custody before the National President of the Actors Guild of Nigeria secured his release from the Nigerian Army after questioning. He was arrested after he was spotted wearing an outfit depicting the flag of Biafra.

 Nominations 
 In the first Nollywood Movie Awards in 2012: Agu was nominated for 'the best actor in indigenous movie for his role' in Nkwocha.
 Zulu African Film Academy Awards (ZAFAA London) 2011: Agu's role in The Maidens earned him nomination for 'the best supporting actor'.
 In the 2008 4th annual African Movie Academy Awards for his role in Across the Niger Agu was nominated for 'the best actor in a supporting role.'.

 Awards 
 Agu was the winner in the first ever Nollywood Movie Awards 2012 for 'the best actor in an indigenous movie: non English speaking language' for his role in Nkwocha''.

References 

Nigerian male film actors
Living people
Male actors from Enugu State
1956 births
Date of birth missing (living people)
20th-century Nigerian male actors
21st-century Nigerian male actors
Nigerian male television actors
Nigerian television actors
Igbo actors
Nigerian media personalities